Sky Scottish was a short-lived satellite television channel operating on the analogue service broadcasts between 6.00pm and 8.00pm.

History
The service was a joint venture between British Sky Broadcasting and ITV franchise Scottish Television owners SMG plc, was aimed at Scots living outside Scotland who would not otherwise be able to receive Scottish-related programming, such as that also transmitted by Grampian or the BBC.

The station's main programmes included an extra edition of Scottish Television's regional news programme Scotland Today and episodes of Take the High Road from 1994. Celtic F.C.'s 1997 pre-season friendlies were shown on the channel. Scotsport was also shown on the channel as well as spin-off show Extra Time, and there was also The Football Show presented by Jim Delahunt and Peter McGuire.

Despite BSkyB and SMG entering into a seven-year contract to run the service, it was closed down after 18 months. Its closure was explained as the channel having failed to meet its financial targets. Reports suggested that only The Ibrox Club Hour and The Celtic Park Hour, programmes relating to Rangers and Celtic football clubs, had attracted more than 10,000 viewers.

Speaking about its demise, the managing director of SMG at the time was Donald Emslie, described the service as having "been a valuable learning experience" for his company. SMG's finance director, Gary Hughes, stated that the service had shown "it is very difficult to access a Scottish audience outside Scotland", but also that Scottish audiences wanted more home-grown programmes.

References

External links
 Official website (archived)
 stv.tv

History of television in the United Kingdom
Defunct television channels in the United Kingdom
Defunct television channels in Scotland
Sky television channels
Television channels and stations established in 1996
Television channels and stations disestablished in 1998
1990s in the United Kingdom
1990s in Scotland
1990s in British television
1990s in Scottish television
STV Group